Federico De Franchi Toso (Genoa, 1560 - Genoa, 23 January 1630) was the 96th Doge of the Republic of Genoa.

Biography 
Third-born son of Gerolamo De Franchi Toso, doge of Genoa in the biennium 1581–1583, and Isabella Sauli, he was born in Genoa around 1560. on June 25, 1623, De Franchi ascended to the highest office of the Genoese state, the 51st in two-year succession and the ninety-sixth in republican history. After a relatively quiet and normal first year of customs mandate, the remaining end of the two-year period was characterized by increasingly tense relationships between the Republic of Genoa and the Duchy of Savoy of Charles Emmanuel I. By now near the outbreak of the conflict, inserted between the war phases of the Thirty Years' War, an agreed advance of the customs elections was chosen. Genoa and the republican government could not have run the risk of a vacant seat in such a delicate war period. The doge voluntarily resigned from office on the morning of 16 June 1625 and already in the evening the Grand Council chose Giacomo Lomellini as his successor. With the arrival of old age and health, the former doge De Franchi attended little the life of the state. De Franchi Toso died on January 23, 1630, in Genoa.

See also 

 Republic of Genoa
 Doge of Genoa

References 

17th-century Doges of Genoa
1560 births
1630 deaths